Dextroamphetamine is a central nervous system (CNS) stimulant and an amphetamine enantiomer that is prescribed for the treatment of attention deficit hyperactivity disorder (ADHD) and narcolepsy. It is also used as an athletic performance and cognitive enhancer, and recreationally as an aphrodisiac and euphoriant.

The amphetamine molecule exists as two enantiomers, levoamphetamine and dextroamphetamine. Dextroamphetamine is the dextrorotatory, or 'right-handed', enantiomer and exhibits more pronounced effects on the central nervous system than levoamphetamine. Pharmaceutical dextroamphetamine sulfate is available as both a brand name and generic drug in a variety of dosage forms. Dextroamphetamine is sometimes prescribed as the inactive prodrug lisdexamfetamine dimesylate, which is converted into dextroamphetamine after absorption.

Dextroamphetamine, like other amphetamines, elicits its stimulating effects via several distinct actions: it inhibits or reverses the transporter proteins for the monoamine neurotransmitters (namely the serotonin, norepinephrine and dopamine transporters) either via trace amine-associated receptor 1 (TAAR1) or in a TAAR1 independent fashion when there are high cytosolic concentrations of the monoamine neurotransmitters and it releases these neurotransmitters from synaptic vesicles via vesicular monoamine transporter 2.

Uses

Medical

Dextroamphetamine is used to treat attention deficit hyperactivity disorder (ADHD) and narcolepsy (a sleep disorder), and is sometimes prescribed  for depression and obesity.

Enhancing performance

Recreational
Dextroamphetamine is also used recreationally as a euphoriant and aphrodisiac, and like other amphetamines is used as a club drug for its energetic and euphoric high. Dextroamphetamine is considered to have a high potential for misuse in a recreational manner since individuals typically report feeling euphoric, more alert, and more energetic after taking the drug. Large recreational doses of dextroamphetamine may produce symptoms of dextroamphetamine overdose. Recreational users sometimes open dexedrine capsules and crush the contents in order to insufflate (snort) it or subsequently dissolve it in water and inject it. Injection into the bloodstream can be dangerous because insoluble fillers within the tablets can block small blood vessels. Chronic overuse of dextroamphetamine can lead to severe drug dependence, resulting in withdrawal symptoms when drug use stops.

Contraindications

Adverse effects

Overdose

Interactions
Many types of substances are known to interact with amphetamine, resulting in altered drug action or metabolism of amphetamine, the interacting substance, or both. Inhibitors of the enzymes that metabolize amphetamine (e.g., CYP2D6 and FMO3) will prolong its elimination half-life, meaning that its effects will last longer. Amphetamine modulates the activity of most psychoactive drugs. In particular, amphetamine may decrease the effects of sedatives and depressants and increase the effects of stimulants and antidepressants. Amphetamine may also decrease the effects of antihypertensives and antipsychotics due to its effects on blood pressure and dopamine respectively. Zinc supplementation may reduce the minimum effective dose of amphetamine when it is used for the treatment of ADHD.

Pharmacology

Pharmacodynamics

Amphetamine and its enantiomers have been identified as potent full agonists of trace amine-associated receptor 1 (TAAR1), a GPCR, discovered in 2001, that is important for regulation of monoaminergic systems in the brain. Activation of TAAR1 increases cAMP production via adenylyl cyclase activation and inhibits the function of the dopamine transporter, norepinephrine transporter, and serotonin transporter, as well as inducing the release of these monoamine neurotransmitters (effluxion). Amphetamine enantiomers are also substrates for a specific neuronal synaptic vesicle uptake transporter called VMAT2. When amphetamine is taken up by VMAT2, the vesicle releases (effluxes) dopamine, norepinephrine, and serotonin, among other monoamines, into the cytosol in exchange.

Dextroamphetamine (the dextrorotary enantiomer) and levoamphetamine (the levorotary enantiomer) have identical pharmacodynamics, but their binding affinities to their biomolecular targets vary. Dextroamphetamine is a more potent agonist of TAAR1 than levoamphetamine. Consequently, dextroamphetamine produces roughly three to four times more central nervous system (CNS) stimulation than levoamphetamine; however, levoamphetamine has slightly greater cardiovascular and peripheral effects.

Related endogenous compounds

Pharmacokinetics

History, society, and culture

Racemic amphetamine was first synthesized under the chemical name "phenylisopropylamine" in Berlin, 1887 by the Romanian chemist Lazar Edeleanu. It was not widely marketed until 1932, when the pharmaceutical company Smith, Kline & French (now known as GlaxoSmithKline) introduced it in the form of the Benzedrine inhaler for use as a bronchodilator. Notably, the amphetamine contained in the Benzedrine inhaler was the liquid free-base, not a chloride or sulfate salt.

Three years later, in 1935, the medical community became aware of the stimulant properties of amphetamine, specifically the dextroamphetamine isomer, and in 1937 Smith, Kline, and French introduced tablets under the brand name Dexedrine. In the United States, Dexedrine was approved to treat narcolepsy and attention disorders. In Canada indications once included epilepsy and parkinsonism. Dextroamphetamine was marketed in various other forms in the following decades, primarily by Smith, Kline, and French, such as several combination medications including a mixture of dextroamphetamine and amobarbital (a barbiturate) sold under the tradename Dexamyl and, in the 1950s, an extended release capsule (the "Spansule"). Preparations containing dextroamphetamine were also used in World War II as a treatment against fatigue.

It quickly became apparent that dextroamphetamine and other amphetamines had a high potential for misuse, although they were not heavily controlled until 1970, when the Comprehensive Drug Abuse Prevention and Control Act was passed by the United States Congress. Dextroamphetamine, along with other sympathomimetics, was eventually classified as Schedule II, the most restrictive category possible for a drug with a government-sanctioned, recognized medical use. Internationally, it has been available under the names AmfeDyn (Italy), Curban (US), Obetrol (Switzerland), Simpamina (Italy), Dexedrine/GSK (US & Canada), Dexedrine/UCB (United Kingdom), Dextropa (Portugal), and Stild (Spain). It became popular on the mod scene in England in the early 1960s, and carried through to the Northern Soul scene in the north of England to the end of the 1970s.

In October 2010, GlaxoSmithKline sold the rights for Dexedrine Spansule to Amedra Pharmaceuticals (a subsidiary of CorePharma).

The U.S. Air Force uses dextroamphetamine as one of its "go pills", given to pilots on long missions to help them remain focused and alert. Conversely, "no-go pills" are used after the mission is completed, to combat the effects of the mission and "go-pills". The Tarnak Farm incident was linked by media reports to the use of this drug on long term fatigued pilots. The military did not accept this explanation, citing the lack of similar incidents. Newer stimulant medications or awakeness promoting agents with different side effect profiles, such as modafinil, are being investigated and sometimes issued for this reason.

Formulations

Transdermal Dextroamphetamine Patches 
Dextroamphetamine is available as a transdermal patch containing dextroamphetamine base under the brand name Xelstrym.

Dextroamphetamine sulfate 

In the United States, immediate release (IR) formulations of dextroamphetamine sulfate are available generically as 5 mg and 10 mg tablets, marketed by Barr (Teva Pharmaceutical Industries), Mallinckrodt Pharmaceuticals, Wilshire Pharmaceuticals, Aurobindo Pharmaceutical USA and CorePharma. Previous IR tablets sold under the brand names Dexedrine and Dextrostat have been discontinued but in 2015, IR tablets became available by the brand name Zenzedi, offered as 2.5 mg, 5 mg, 7.5 mg, 10 mg, 15 mg, 20 mg and 30 mg tablets. Dextroamphetamine sulfate is also available as a controlled-release (CR) capsule preparation in strengths of 5 mg, 10 mg, and 15 mg under the brand name Dexedrine Spansule, with generic versions marketed by Barr and Mallinckrodt. A bubblegum flavored oral solution is available under the brand name ProCentra, manufactured by FSC Pediatrics, which is designed to be an easier method of administration in children who have difficulty swallowing tablets, each 5 mL contains 5 mg dextroamphetamine. The conversion rate between dextroamphetamine sulfate to amphetamine free base is .728.

In Australia, dexamfetamine is available in bottles of 100 instant release 5 mg tablets as a generic drug or slow release dextroamphetamine preparations may be compounded by individual chemists. In the United Kingdom, it is available in 5 mg instant release sulfate tablets under the generic name dexamfetamine sulfate as well as 10 mg and 20 mg strength tablets under the brand name Amfexa. It is also available in generic dexamfetamine sulfate 5 mg/ml oral sugar-free syrup. The brand name Dexedrine was available in the United Kingdom prior to UCB Pharma disinvesting  the product to another pharmaceutical company (Auden Mckenzie).

Lisdexamfetamine 

Dextroamphetamine is the active metabolite of the prodrug lisdexamfetamine (L-lysine-dextroamphetamine), available by the brand name Vyvanse (Elvanse in the European market) (Venvanse in the Brazil market) (lisdexamfetamine dimesylate). Dextroamphetamine is liberated from lisdexamfetamine enzymatically following contact with red blood cells. The conversion is rate-limited by the enzyme, which prevents high blood concentrations of dextroamphetamine and reduces lisdexamfetamine's drug liking and abuse potential at clinical doses. Vyvanse is marketed as once-a-day dosing as it provides a slow release of dextroamphetamine into the body. Vyvanse is available as capsules, and chewable tablets, and in seven strengths; 10 mg, 20 mg, 30 mg, 40 mg, 50 mg, 60 mg, and 70 mg. The conversion rate between lisdexamfetamine dimesylate (Vyvanse) to dextroamphetamine base is 29.5%.

Adderall

Another pharmaceutical that contains dextroamphetamine is commonly known by the brand name Adderall. It is available as immediate release (IR) tablets and extended release (XR) capsules. Adderall contains equal amounts of four amphetamine salts:

One-quarter racemic (d,l-)amphetamine aspartate monohydrate
One-quarter dextroamphetamine saccharate
One-quarter dextroamphetamine sulfate
One-quarter racemic (d,l-)amphetamine sulfate

Adderall has a total amphetamine base equivalence of 63%. While the enantiomer ratio by dextroamphetamine salts to levoamphetamine salts is 3:1, the amphetamine base content is 75.9% dextroamphetamine, 24.1% levoamphetamine.

Notes

Image legend

Reference notes

References

External links

 
Poison Information Monograph (PIM 178: Dexamphetamine Sulphate)

Amphetamine
Anorectics
Aphrodisiacs
Drugs acting on the cardiovascular system
Drugs acting on the nervous system
Enantiopure drugs
Ergogenic aids
Euphoriants
Excitatory amino acid reuptake inhibitors
Nootropics
Norepinephrine-dopamine releasing agents
Phenethylamines
Stimulants
Substituted amphetamines
TAAR1 agonists
Attention deficit hyperactivity disorder management
VMAT inhibitors
World Anti-Doping Agency prohibited substances